Marois may refer to:

 Barbara Marois (1963-), American field hockey player
 Daniel Marois (1968-), Canadian ice hockey player
 Jean Marois (artist), Canadian painter and writer
 Jean-Pierre Marois, French film director and producer
 Mario Marois (1957-), Canadian ice hockey player
 Pauline Marois, (1949-), Canadian politician
 Prix Jacques Le Marois, French flat horse race